The Wheaton College Billy Graham Center was founded and opened in 1981 on the campus of Wheaton College in Wheaton, Illinois. Named after Billy Graham, the center is the primary location for many of Wheaton College's bible and theology classes, as well as the graduate school's main headquarters, and host to multiple museums and auditoriums.

The Wheaton College Billy Graham Center Museum, opened in 1980, is designed to help visitors "extend their understanding of the good news about Jesus", and contains exhibits about the history of Christian evangelism in the United States and the ministry of Billy Graham. Changing exhibits are designed around the themes of evangelism, missions and Christian art.

The center differs from the Billy Graham Library, opened in 2007 in Charlotte, North Carolina; the library serves primarily as an evangelical tool for the Billy Graham Evangelistic Association and is open to the general public.

According to journalist Jeff Sharlet, The Billy Graham Center holds 600 boxes of records for the Christian political organization The Fellowship.

References

External links 

Religious museums in Illinois
Museums in DuPage County, Illinois
Buildings and structures in Wheaton, Illinois
Graham, Billy
Billy Graham